is a private junior college in Hirosaki, Aomori Prefecture, Japan. It was established in 1950, and is now attached to Tohoku Women's College.

Departments
 Department of Clothing
 Department of Home Economics
 Department of Child Care

See also 
 List of junior colleges in Japan

External links
  

Japanese junior colleges